Shenyang Institute of Automation of the Chinese Academy of Sciences (CAS) was founded in 1958. It is mainly engaged in mechatronic engineering, pattern recognition and intelligent system, control theory and control engineering, computer applied technology.

External links
Homepage

Research institutes in China